There are multiple train stations in Japan named Jūjō Station:

Jūjō Station (Tokyo) on the JR East Saikyō Line in Kita-ku, Tokyo
Jūjō Station (Kintetsu) on the Kintetsu Kyōto Line in Minami-ku, Kyoto
Jūjō Station (Kyoto Municipal Subway) on the Kyoto Municipal Subway Karasuma Line in Minami-ku, Kyoto